Cusop is a village and civil parish in Herefordshire, England that lies at the foot of Cusop Hill next to the town of Hay-on-Wye in Wales.  It is a short walk from Hay, the distance between bus stops, and can be reached by walking or driving out of Hay towards Bredwardine, and turning right into Cusop Dingle.

Etymology and history

The village is possibly first recorded in Domesday Book, as "Cheweshope", and certainly attested in the later twelfth century as Kiweshope, in 1292 as Kywishope, and as Kusop and Cusop from 1302. The second element of the name is agreed to originate as the Old English word hōp 'valley'. The origin of the first element, however, is uncertain. One possibility is that the first part of the name was once the name of a stream which ran through the eponymous valley, perhaps one of a number of examples of Brittonic river-names corresponding to the Welsh word cyw 'young of an animal'.

The Manor of Cusop formed part of the Ewyas Lacy Hundred and was once owned by the Clanowe family, Edward III, Henry ap Griffith, Vaughans of Moccas and the Cornewall Family, lastly George Cornewall.

Notable people 

The writer L.T.C. Rolt lived here as a boy between 1914 and 1922, in a house then known as "Radnor View", in a development locally called "Thirty Acres". He went on to co-found the Inland Waterways Association and the Talyllyn Railway Preservation Society, and to write many books on transport, engineering biography and industrial archaeology.

Penelope Chetwode, separated wife of Poet Laureate John Betjeman, mother of journalist and writer Candida Lycett Green and author of Two Middle-Aged Ladies in Andalucia, lived at New House, a cottage on Cusop Hill.

Castles
There are two castles associated with the village: Cusop Castle and Mouse Castle, or Llygad.

Cusop Castle is 200 yards from the church, formerly a fortified residence.

Mouse Castle is an unfinished motte-and-bailey earthwork, consisting of a rock boss with an artificially scarped vertical side. The castle was held by the de Clanowe family in the 14th century.

St Mary's Church

The church of St Mary, Cusop, although heavily restored over the centuries (and in particular in 1857; the North Vestry, South Porch and the W. wall of the nave are modern) still retains a Norman chancel arch, a Norman window (the west-most in the south wall), and a Norman font. Its scissor beam roof structure dates back to the 14th century. In the churchyard may be found the graves of the Methodist Martyr William Seward,  'lawyer, author and yachtsman' Martin Beales, and Kitty (Katherine Mary) Armstrong (née Friend), victim of the notorious Hay Poisoner, a Commonwealth war grave of a Herefordshire Regiment soldier of World War I, as well as a ring of ancient yew trees.

Cusop Dingle
Cusop Dingle is a wooded valley near the village. It is notable in entomological history as the place where the fly Platypeza hirticeps was discovered in 1899.

In the Dingle is a single track road, locally known as 'Millionaire's Row', because of the large, Victorian houses which line the route up to Offa's Dyke Path, one of the popular walking tracks in the West of England.  It runs alongside the Dulas Brook (forming the border between Wales and England) into the foothills of the Black Mountains. With a multitude of waterfalls, the Dulas Brook is home to trout, otter and kingfishers.

Cusop Dingle was home to the poisoner Herbert Rowse Armstrong, the only English solicitor ever hanged for murder, and the grave of his wife Katharine is in the parish churchyard. His former home, originally Mayfield but now The Mantles, was owned by Martin Beales, a solicitor working in Armstrong's old office in Hay. Beales believed that Armstrong was innocent and published a book arguing his case.

Geology

The bedrock is Old Red Sandstone (often referred to as the 'ORS') consisting of Upper Silurian strata overlain by the Lower Devonian. In the upper reaches of Cusop is a notable geological horizon known as the Townsend Tuff Bed, which is a volcanic air-fall ash band. Today this is a marker used in the Anglo-Welsh ORS area to divide the Silurian from the Devonian. Previously the calcrete zone "often quarried for limestone" was considered as the boundary between the Silurian and Devonian. These inorganically formed calcrete limestones were formerly known as the Psammosteus Limestones but now known as the Bishops Frome Limestone.

The rock sequences have been studied by many geologists in the 19th and 20th centuries. Perhaps one of the first was Roderick Murchison who travelled this way in the early 1830s in search of material for his book The Silurian System. He notes the quarrying and even an attempt to find coal in the side of Cusop Hill near 'The Criggy' circa 1800 by a tenant of Sir George Cornewalle. The rocks hereabouts do have blackish colourings in places of very early plant life and even primitive fishes have been found but mostly as disarticulated remains. Fish scales, boney plates and scales are usually found in pellety gritty beds.

Errol White and Harry Toombs of the Natural History Museum in London looked over the area in the 1930/40s for fossil fishes; many now reside in that museum. Although Murchison was one of the first to make notes of fossils here, other geologists past and present have looked over the area.

References

External links 

Cusop community website

Villages in Herefordshire
Civil parishes in Herefordshire